Wiercioch is Polish surname. Notable people with the surname include:

 Adam Wiercioch (born 1980), Polish fencer
 Patrick Wiercioch (born 1990), Canadian ice hockey player

Polish-language surnames